Mangwe is a constituency of the National Assembly of the Parliament of Zimbabwe. Located in Matabeleland South Province, is currently represented by Hlanani Mguni of ZANU–PF since a 7 September 2019 by-election. Previously, it was represented by Obedingwa Mguni until his death on 18 June 2019.

Members

References 

Matabeleland South Province
Parliamentary constituencies in Zimbabwe